Kakȣenthiony (also spelled Cachointioni and other variations) (died June 1756), also known as Red Head, was an important member of the Onondaga council, and official speaker of the Onondagas.

References

 

Onondaga
1756 deaths
Year of birth unknown